Martin Dixon may refer to:

 Martin Dixon (politician) (born 1955), Australian politician
 Martin Dixon (academic lawyer), British academic lawyer
 Martin Dixon (speedway rider) (born 1961), English speedway rider